Noa Minsker (born 29 June 1993) is an Israeli judoka.

She is the bronze medallist of the 2017 Judo Grand Prix Antalya in the -48 kg category.

References

External links
 
 

1993 births
Living people
Israeli female judoka